Cavity Search Records is a record label in Portland, Oregon that was formed in 1992 by Christopher Cooper and Denny Swofford. It is known for producing debut records by Hazel, Heatmiser, The Helio Sequence, King Black Acid, Richmond Fontaine, Danny Barnes, Saul Conrad, Pete Krebs, Korgy, Pete Krebs, Richmond Fontaine, and Elliott Smith.

Cavity Search Records was recognized on its 26th anniversary by Mayor Ted Wheeler and the city of Portland. September 21, 2018, was proclaimed to be Cavity Search Records day for the label's contribution to the city's art and creative industry, and its commitment to uncovering and supporting local artistry.

Christopher Cooper passed away on September 24, 2018. A memorial was held October 18th that year.

Artists
The following artists have released records on Cavity Search:

Atomic 61
Barra Brown
Control Freak
Danny Barnes
Devin Millar
dirtclodfight
Down Gown
Elliott Sharp
Elliott Smith
Film Star
Gentlemen of Leisure
Gern Blanston
Greg Gilmore/Doghead
Golden Delicious
Hazel
Heatmiser
The Helio Sequence
Jerry Joseph
Jesse Daniel Edwards
King Black Acid
Korgy & Bass
Lauren Lakis
Robert Wynia
Mike Scheer
Pete Krebs
Queen Chief
Rattlecake
Richmond Fontaine
Satan's Pilgrims
Saul Conrad
Snow Bud and the Flower People
Steve Drizos
Steve Lacy
Survival Skills 
Thrillhammer
Trailer Queen
Travis Shallow
Wayne Horvitz
Will Hattman

Discography

Bibliography

Distribution
Early in its history, Cavity Search records were distributed by Alternative Distribution Alliance, an American company founded in 1993. In May 2012 Cavity Search was announced as one of the first nine labels to join the newly formed Frenchkiss Label Group. Frenchkiss Records, founded by Syd Butler, had started the distribution company earlier that year, which is "focused on growing visibility for indie labels in the spirit of communities such as Dischord, Rough Trade and Touch & Go."  At that point, Frenchkiss had ceased its affiliation with RED and had begun working with The Orchard.

See also
List of record labels

References

Further reading
Denny Swofford appears in
Malfunkshun: The Andrew Wood Story by Scot Barbour (2005)
Searching for Elliott Smith by Gil Reyes (2009)
Torment Saint the Life of Elliott Smith by William Todd Schultz (2013)
Andy Wood, Inventore Del Grunge: Vivere (e Morire) A Seattle Prima Dei Pearl Jam by Valeria Sgarella (Italian Edition, 2016)
My Favorite Elliott Smith Song Podcast (2018)
My Favorite Elliott Smith Song Podcast (2019)

External links
Cavity Search Records

 
Companies based in Portland, Oregon
American independent record labels
Record labels established in 1992
Indie rock record labels
Oregon record labels
1992 establishments in Oregon